Frances Jennifer Adamson,  (born 20 April 1961) is an Australian public servant and diplomat who is the 36th Governor of South Australia, in office since 7 October 2021.

Early life and education
Adamson was born in Adelaide, South Australia, the daughter of former politician Jennifer Cashmore and prominent Adelaide businessman Ian Adamson, and step-daughter of reporter Stewart Cockburn. Her sister, Christine Adamson is a New South Wales Supreme Court judge.

Adamson was educated at the Walford Anglican School for Girls and the University of Adelaide, where she received a Bachelor of Economics. In 1984 she was the first female captain of the Adelaide University Boat Club.

Career

Diplomatic career
Adamson joined the Australian Public Service in 1985. She was an economist at the Australian Consulate-General in Hong Kong from 1987 to 1991, before moving to London where she worked at the Australian High Commission to the United Kingdom  as a political counsellor for five years. She returned to Australia to work for the Department of Foreign Affairs in Canberra from 1998 until 2000, and then moved to Taipei where she was Representative to the Australian Commerce and Industry Office for five years. She returned to London as Deputy High Commissioner to the United Kingdom from 2005 until 2008.

While in London, Adamson met Foreign Minister Stephen Smith, who asked her to become his Chief of Staff. She took the role on condition that she could manage her young family, and that as a "career diplomat" she would not get involved in politics. When Smith moved to the Defence portfolio, she went with him.

Between 2011 and 2015, Adamson held the post of Australian Ambassador to the People's Republic of China, the first woman in the position. During her time there, the China-Australia Free Trade Agreement was negotiated and she has been credited with pushing the idea of partnership with the newly appointed Xi Jinping, allowing the "political and diplomatic relationships" between the two countries to "finally" catch up with the economic one.

In 2015, Adamson was appointed a foreign policy adviser to Prime Minister Malcolm Turnbull.

On 20 July 2016, she was appointed Secretary of the Department of Foreign Affairs and Trade (DFAT); the first female Secretary to be appointed to the portfolio. 

Adamson served as the ACT Division of the Institute of Public Administration President from 2017 to 2019 and outlined her views on public service in her final speech as President. She was made a National Fellow of IPAA in 2019.

Governor of South Australia
On 19 May 2021, it was announced by Premier Steven Marshall that Adamson would be succeeding Hieu Van Le as Governor of South Australia in October 2021.  Following her nomination for Governor of South Australia, Adamson retired from the public service in June 2021. Foreign Minister Marise Payne said Adamson was one of "Australia's most accomplished and respected public servants and diplomats" and Marshall said her "wealth of knowledge on the international stage will put South Australia in good stead as we continue to put South Australia on the global map."

Adamson was sworn in as Governor of South Australia in a formal ceremony at Government House, Adelaide on 7 October 2021.

Awards and honours

In the 2021 Queen's Birthday Honours Adamson was appointed a Companion of the Order of Australia for "eminent service to public administration through the advancement of Australia's diplomatic, trade and cultural interests, particularly with the People's Republic of China and the Indo-Pacific region, to innovative foreign policy development and high level program delivery, and as the 36th Governor appointed in South Australia."

Personal life
Adamson met and married Rod Bunten, a British diplomat, when they were both posted in Hong Kong. They have four children.

References

External links
 Her Excellency the Honourable Frances Adamson AC, Governor of South Australia

 

1961 births
Living people
Companions of the Order of Australia
Governors of South Australia
Australian public servants
People from Adelaide
Ambassadors of Australia to China
University of Adelaide alumni
Australian women ambassadors
Representatives of Australia to Taiwan